Smashmouth or smash mouth  may refer to:
Smashmouth offense, an American football system
Smash Mouth, a pop rock group from San Jose, California, named after the American football term
Smash Mouth (album), their self-titled third album
Smashmouth (indie rock band), an indie rock band from Nebraska